Clipper City, The Replica -built in 1984 was originally owner by Jim Shaw, Tony Meoli, Don McCaughey and Ron Levison and Managed daily by Billy Blocher - all of Bel Air, Md. Many Great Times and weddings were had on this ship for the first 20 years...Tom Waite was the first Captain.  

Clipper City is a modern replica of a nineteenth-century cargo schooner.

The original Clipper City
The first Clipper City was a cargo clipper schooner built in Manitowoc, Wisconsin in 1854. Manitowoc soon became known for its shipbuilding industry, and "Clipper City" was adopted as a nickname for the town itself. A replica cross section of the Clipper City is on permanent display at the Wisconsin Maritime Museum.

The replica
In 1984, the plans for the original Clipper City were purchased from the Smithsonian Institution, and naval architects DeJong & Lebet, Inc. were hired to adapt the design to meet modern safety requirements. The new vessel, also named Clipper City, was a steel-hulled schooner carrying eight sails on two steel masts: six fore-and-aft rigged sails, and two square topsails.

The Clipper City offered passenger sails out of Baltimore, Maryland for over twenty years, with occasional trips to the Caribbean and other destinations.

Current status
In 2007, Clipper Citys then owner, John Kircher, filed for bankruptcy to avoid foreclosure on the vessel by Regal Bancorp, Inc. Clipper Citys Coast Guard certification was revoked shortly thereafter due to a hull failure. Following a brief seizure by U.S. Marshals, the vessel was sold at auction to Regal Bancorp for $350,000.

Clipper City was then purchased by ESV Corp and rebuilt to original condition.  She operates as a day sail tour boat, running out of Battery Park in New York City, and is also available for private charters and corporate events by Manhattan By Sail.

See also
 List of schooners

References

External links 

 Manhattan by Sail—official site

Culture of Baltimore
Individual sailing vessels
Replica ships
Schooners of the United States
Tall ships of the United States
Two-masted ships
1854 ships
Chesapeake Bay boats
Ships built in Manitowoc, Wisconsin